The Southern National 200 presented by Solid Rock Carriers was an 80-mile (128.748 km) ARCA Menards Series East race held at Southern National Motorsports Park in Kenly, North Carolina. The inaugural race was held in 2021 and won by Sammy Smith.

Past winners

References

External links
 

2021 establishments in North Carolina
ARCA Menards Series East